Arsen Mihajlović (born 2 June 1969) is a Serbian retired footballer.

He became a top 5-goalscorer in the Greek second tier twice, in 1992–93 and 1993–94, both for Anagennisi Giannitsa.

References

1969 births
Living people
Serbian footballers
Anagennisi Giannitsa F.C. players
Anorthosis Famagusta F.C. players
APOP Paphos FC players
Ethnikos Assia FC players
Association football midfielders
Serbian expatriate footballers
Expatriate footballers in Greece
Serbian expatriate sportspeople in Greece
Expatriate footballers in Cyprus
Serbian expatriate sportspeople in Cyprus
Cypriot First Division players